Roy Rosenfeld is an Israeli progressive house DJ and music producer based in Tel Aviv. 

Born in Jerusalem, Rosenfeld began playing piano when he was 12, and electronic music at age 15—with a Roland RM1X given to him by his father. He released his first music commercially in 2009.

He has collaborated on multiple occasions with his friends Guy J and Eli Nissan.

Discography

Singles & EPs
"Otro", Lost & Found, 2020
"Tikkva", Systematic Recordings, 2017

References

Progressive house musicians
Israeli DJs
Year of birth missing (living people)
Living people